The 2020–2021 India–Pakistan border skirmishes were a series of armed clashes between India and Pakistan along the Line of Control in the disputed region of Kashmir, which is subject to extensive territorial claims by both countries. The standoff intensified when a major exchange of gunfire and shelling erupted between Indian and Pakistani troops in November 2020 along the Line of Control which left at least 22 dead, including 11 civilians.

Casualties

According to Indian Army sources, 11 Pakistani soldiers were killed in clashes, while 16 soldiers were injured. Six Indian civilians, four soldiers and one border guard were killed per the Indian Defence Ministry. Indian military released videos which showed mortars hitting and damaging Pakistani bunkers along the border.

Pakistani military sources said that five civilians and one soldier were killed in Pakistani-administered Kashmir amidst the clashes.

On 21 November, two Indian soldiers were killed in Rajouri. On 26 November, one Indian soldier was killed in Poonch and an additional two Indian military fatalities were reported in Rajouri on 27 November. On 15 December, two Pakistani soldiers were killed in the Bagsar region of Azad Kashmir according to Pakistan.

In November, Pakistan's foreign ministry said India had violated ceasefire at least 2,729 times in 2020 which resulted in the deaths of 21 Pakistani civilians and seriously injured 206 others.

Peace agreement 
India and Pakistan released a joint statement, stating that after discussions, the two sides agreed to "strict observance" of all peace and ceasefire agreements with effect from midnight 25 February 2021. Both sides agreed existing forms of contact and border flag meetings would be utilized to resolve any future misunderstanding.

See also
 India–Pakistan relations
 Line of Control
 India–Pakistan border
 Kashmir conflict

References

2020 in international relations
2020 in Pakistan
2021 in international relations
2021 in Pakistan
2020s in Jammu and Kashmir
21st century in Azad Kashmir
21st century in Gilgit-Baltistan
Conflicts in 2020
Conflicts in 2021
2020-2021 border skirmishes
Kashmir conflict
Pakistan
November 2020 events in Pakistan
November 2020 events in Asia
December 2020 events in Asia
Pakistan
December 2020 events in Pakistan
January 2021 events in Asia
Pakistan
January 2021 events in Pakistan